The All-Ireland Senior B Hurling Championship of 1976 was the third staging of Ireland's secondary hurling knock-out competition.  Kerry won the championship, beating London 0–15 to 1–10 in the final at Croke Park, Dublin.

The championship

Participating teams

Format

Quarter-final: (1 match) This is a lone game between the two first teams drawn.  One team is eliminated at this stage while the winners advance to the semi-final.

Semi-finals: (2 matches) The winners of the lone quarter final join the three other teams to make up the semi-final pairings.  Two teams are eliminated at this stage while the two winners advance to the 'home' final.

Home final: (1 match) The winners of the two semi-finals contest this game.  One team is eliminated at this stage while the winners advance to the 'proper' All-Ireland final.

Final: (1 match) The winners of the All-Ireland 'home' final join London to contest this game.  One team is eliminated at this stage while the winners are allowed to participate in the All-Ireland SHC quarter-final.

Fixtures

All-Ireland Senior B Hurling Championship

Championship statistics

Scoring

Widest winning margin: 18 points
Kerry 5-11 : 1-5 Roscommon (All-Ireland semi-final)
Most goals in a match: 6
Kerry 3-12 : 3-11 Laois (All-Ireland quarter-final)
Kerry 5-11 : 1-5 Roscommon (All-Ireland semi-final)
Antrim 6-10 : 0-12 Carlow (All-Ireland semi-final)
Most points in a match: 25
Kerry 2-17 : 3-8 Antrim (All-Ireland 'home' final)
Kerry 0-15 : 1-10 London (All-Ireland final)
Most goals by one team in a match: 6
Antrim 6-10 : 0-12 Carlow (All-Ireland semi-final)
Most goals scored by a losing team: 3
Laois 3-11 : 3-12 Kerry (All-Ireland quarter-final)
Antrim 3-8 : 2-17 Kerry (All-Ireland 'home' final)
Most points scored by a losing team: 12
Carlow 0-12 : 6-10 Antrim (All-Ireland semi-final)

Top scorers

Season

References

 Donegan, Des, The Complete Handbook of Gaelic Games (DBA Publications Limited, 2005).

1976
B